The Time of Their Lives is a 2017 British road comedy film directed and written by Roger Goldby and starring Joan Collins as Helen Shelley and Pauline Collins (no relation) as Priscilla.

The film was released on 10 March 2017 in the United Kingdom, followed by Australia, France and Nordic countries by Universal Pictures and Independent Film Company.

Premise
Joan Collins abandons her usual glamour to play a faded and forgotten movie star living in an old folks home in London, who determines to somehow travel to her ex-lover's funeral in France in the hopes of staging a comeback. She coerces downtrodden housewife Priscilla (Pauline Collins) into accompanying her on the eventful journey, during which the odd duo become involved with a reclusive artist, played by Franco Nero. At the outset the selfish, egocentric, manipulative Helen seems to have little in common with the timid Priscilla, however during  the course of their adventure the two women undergo life changes that bond them together.

Cast
Joan Collins as Helen
Pauline Collins as Priscilla
Franco Nero as Alberto
Ronald Pickup as Frank
Siân Reeves as Sarah
Joely Richardson as Lucy
Michael Brandon as Harry Scheider

Production
On 6 February 2014 it was announced that Joan Collins and Pauline Collins, along with Franco Nero would star in The Time of Their Lives directed by Roger Goldby. Filming began in France in July 2016. In the UK, scenes were shot in Portsmouth, Bournemouth and London.

Reception

Box office
The Time of Their Lives has grossed a total worldwide of $1.2 million.

Critical response
On review aggregator Rotten Tomatoes, the film holds an approval rating of 18% based on 22 reviews, and an average rating of 3.9/10. On Metacritic, the film has a weighted average score of 34 out of 100, based on 5 critics, indicating "generally unfavorable reviews".

References

External links

The Time of Their Lives at Box Office Mojo

2017 films
2017 comedy films
Films about old age
Universal Pictures films
Vertigo Films films
Films scored by Stephen Warbeck
2010s English-language films